Lina Aristodimou (born 30 March 1965) is a Cypriot alpine skier. She competed at the 1980 Winter Olympics and the 1984 Winter Olympics. She was the first woman to represent Cyprus at the Olympics.

References

1965 births
Living people
Cypriot female alpine skiers
Olympic alpine skiers of Cyprus
Alpine skiers at the 1980 Winter Olympics
Alpine skiers at the 1984 Winter Olympics
Sportspeople from Nicosia